Conor Reilly (born August 20, 1986) is a former American football defensive end for the Iowa Barnstormers and Cleveland Gladiators of the Arena Football League. He played college football at Ohio University.

Early years
Reilly earned All-Ohio honors at Defensive End in 2004.

College career
Reilly played for the Ohio Bobcats from 2006 to 2009. He was redshirted in 2005.

Professional career

Iowa Barnstormers
Reilly was signed by the Iowa Barnstormers on October 28, 2010. He was released by the Barnstormers on March 7, 2011

Cleveland Gladiators
Reilly signed with the Cleveland Gladiators on April 26, 2011. He appeared in 11 games for the Gladiators.

Coaching career
Reilly has served as an assistant coach at the College of Wooster.

References

1986 births
Living people
American football defensive linemen
Ohio Bobcats football players
Cleveland Gladiators players
Wooster Fighting Scots football coaches
People from Hudson, Ohio
Players of American football from Ohio